Patrick Q. Mason (born 1976) is an American historian specializing in the study of the Latter-day Saint movement. Since 2019, he has held the Leonard J. Arrington Chair of Mormon History and Culture at Utah State University.

Early life and education
Mason earned a BA in history from Brigham Young University in 1999, an MA in history from the University of Notre Dame in 2003 and a second MA there in International Peace Studies, also in 2003. In 2005 he was awarded a PhD in history, also from the University of Notre Dame.

As a graduate student, he took a summer seminary at Brigham Young University in Latter-day Saint history run by Richard L. Bushman.

Career
Mason was the Howard W. Hunter Chair in Mormon Studies at Claremont Graduate University from 2011–2018. He previously held positions at American University in Cairo and the Joan B. Kroc Institute for International Peace Studies at the University of Notre Dame. He has been interviewed and cited as an expert on Mormonism by outlets such as the Los Angeles Times, NPR, The Salt Lake Tribune, Religion Dispatches Magazine, and KPCC public radio in Pasadena, California.

In January 2012, Mason published an opinion piece in The Washington Post regarding diversity within Latter Day Saints thought. He was featured on New England Cable News in May 2012 regarding the "Mormon movement" in Arkansas, and has been quoted in both the New York Times and the Los Angeles Times on Republican presidential candidate Mitt Romney. Mason is also the author of The Mormon Menace: Violence and Anti-Mormonism in the Postbellum South which received positive reviews in the Journal of American History and the Journal of Southern Religion. He has also authored a number of articles and book chapters on Mormonism and American religion history.

Mason's research projects as of 2006 included a biography of Ezra Taft Benson, a former president of the Church of Jesus Christ of Latter-day Saints (LDS Church), and a book on Mormon theology and ethic of peace.

In 2016, Mason advocated for what he described as a more embracing LDS Church. Mason participated in a short-lived joint blog in a current-issues/events debate format, at the non-partisan religion website Patheos.com, with the psychologist John P. Dehlin, who has often been critical of the LDS Church.

Selected works 
Books
 The Mormon Menace: Violence and Anti-Mormonism in the Postbellum South  Oxford University Press, 2011.  
Planted: Belief and Belonging in an Age of Doubt Deseret Book, Neal A. Maxwell Institute for Religious Scholarship, 2015 
Mormonism and Violence Cambridge University Press, 2019 

Articles and chapters
 “Honor, the Unwritten Law, and Extralegal Violence: Contextualizing Parley Pratt’s Murder,” in Parley P. Pratt and the Making of Mormonism, ed. Gregory Armstrong, Matthew J. Grow, and Dennis Siler (Norman, OK: Arthur H. Clark, 2011), 245-273.
 “God and the People: Theodemocracy in Nineteenth-Century Mormonism,” Journal of Church and State 53:3 (Summer 2011): 349-375.
 “Opposition to Polygamy in the Postbellum South,” Journal of Southern History 76:3 (August 2010): 541-578.
 “What’s So Bad about Polygamy? Teaching American Religious History in the Muslim Middle East,” Journal of American History 96:4 (March 2010): 1112-1118.
 “Shrine of the Black Madonna,” “Lynching,” and “Henry McNeal Turner,” in The Encyclopedia of African American History, ed. Leslie Alexander and Walter Rucker (Santa Barbara, CA: ABC- CLIO, 2010): 257-258, 871-874, 1060-1062.
 “Christian Zionism and Its Religious Influence in American Politics,” with Khadiga Omar, US-Arab Issues no. 1 (Spring 2009), Prince Alwaleed Bin Talal Bin Abdulaziz Alsaud Center for American Studies and Research, American University in Cairo.
 “The Prohibition of Interracial Marriage in Utah, 1888-1963,” Utah Historical Quarterly 76:2 (Spring 2008): 108-131.
 “‘In Our Image, After Our Likeness’: The Meaning of a Black Deity in the African American Protest Tradition, 1880-1970,” in “We Will Independent Be”: African-American Place Making and the Struggle to Claim Space in the United States, ed. Angel David Nieves and Leslie M. Alexander (Boulder: University of Colorado Press, 2008), 463-487.
 “Anti-Jewish Violence in the New South,” Southern Jewish History 8 (2005): 77-119. 
 “The Possibilities of Mormon Peacebuilding,” Dialogue: A Journal of Mormon Thought 37:1 (Spring 2004): 12-45 – winner of Dialogue’s Best Article in Its Category Prize (2005).
 “Traditions of Violence: Early Mormon and Anti-Mormon Conflict in Its American Setting,” in Richard L. Bushman, ed., Archive of Restoration Culture Summer Fellows’ Papers, 2000-2002 (Provo, UT: Joseph Fielding Smith Institute for Latter-day Saint History, 2005), 163-185.

References

External links
 Claremont Graduate University Official Page
 

1976 births
American Latter Day Saint writers
Claremont Graduate University faculty
Historians of the Latter Day Saint movement
Historians of the United States
Living people
Mormon studies scholars
University of Notre Dame alumni
American historians of religion
American male non-fiction writers
Brigham Young University alumni
American bloggers
Latter Day Saints from Indiana
Latter Day Saints from California
21st-century American non-fiction writers
American male bloggers
Historians from California